Age of Fracture is a 2011 history book about the disintegration of shared values in American social debate around the 1980s. It was written by Daniel T. Rodgers and published by Belknap Press. It won the 2012 Bancroft Prize.

Further reading

External links 

 
 Interview with the author

2011 non-fiction books
History books about the United States
Bancroft Prize-winning works
Belknap Press books